The  2018–19 season is Asociația Club Sportiv Sepsi OSK Sfântu Gheorghe's 8th season in existence and the 2nd season in Liga I. Sepsi will compete in the Liga I and Cupa României.

Previous season positions

Players

Squad information
Players and squad numbers last updated on 7 October 2018.Note: Flags indicate national team as has been defined under FIFA eligibility rules. Players may hold more than one non-FIFA nationality.

Transfers

In

Loans in

Out

Loans out

Overall transfer activity

Expenditure

Income

Net Totals

Pre-season and friendlies

Competitions

Overview

Liga I

The Liga I fixture list was announced on 5 July 2018.

Regular season

Table

Results summary

Results by round

Matches

Championship round

Table

Results summary

Position by round

Matches

Cupa României

Statistics

Appearances and goals

|-
! colspan=14 style="background:#dcdcdc; text-align:center"|Goalkeepers

 
|-
! colspan=14 style="background:#dcdcdc; text-align:center"|Defenders

  

|-
! colspan=14 style="background:#dcdcdc; text-align:center"|Midfielders

|-
! colspan=14 style="background:#dcdcdc; text-align:center"|Forwards

                  

|-
! colspan=14 style="background:#dcdcdc; text-align:center"|Transferred in mid-season

|-

Goalscorers

Clean sheets

Disciplinary record

See also

 2018–19 Cupa României
 2018–19 Liga I

References

Sepsi OSK Sfântu Gheorghe seasons
Sepsi, Sfântu Gheorghe, OSK